Vanessa Gronemann (born 7 September 1989 in Hofgeismar) is a German politician from Alliance 90/The Greens. She has been a member of the Hesse State Parliament since 2019.

Life 

In 2013, Gronemann completed an internship with the member of the State Parliament Monne Lentz. She became chairwoman of the Kassel city district association from Green Party in 2015. In 2017, she became a staff member in the constituency office for Bettina Hoffmann, a member of Bundestag. Since 2018, she is the head of the local advisory council in Kassel-Mitte.

She is a member of Alliance 90/The Greens parliamentary group in Kassel City Hall and spokesperson for sports, health, tourism and LGBT. She is also a member of the Cultural Commission of the Kassel City Council.

With 26.7 percent of the constituency votes, Gronemann won the 2018 Hesse state election in the Kassel-City constituency I. In the state parliamentary group of Alliance 90/The Greens, she is responsible for the district of Kassel and spokesperson for the topics of species protection, consumer protection and sports.

References

External links 
  Vanessa-Gronemann
 Website von Vanessa Gronemann

1989 births
Living people
Alliance 90/The Greens politicians
Members of the Landtag of Hesse
21st-century German politicians
21st-century German women politicians